Michael Krumm (born 19 March 1970) is a German professional racing driver. He won the All-Japan GT Championship in the GT500 class in 1997 and 2003 for TOM'S and Nismo, respectively, and in 2011 he won the FIA GT1 World Championship driving for JR Motorsports.

Biography
Born in Reutlingen, Krumm married Japanese tennis player Kimiko Date on 1 December 2001 at St. Mary's Cathedral, Tokyo. Kimiko Date announced their divorce on Twitter on September 26, 2016.

Career

1984 Karting
1988 German Formula Ford, one win
1989 German Formula Ford Champion, three wins
1990 German Formula Opel Lotus champion
1991 Formula Opel Lotus Euroseries
1992 German Formula Three, one win
1993 German Formula Three, four wins
1994 Japanese Formula Three champion, six wins
1995 Japanese Touring Car Championship, 1 win, Formula Nippon & All-Japan GT
1996 Japanese Touring Car Championship, 1 win, Formula Nippon & Japanese Touring Car Championship, 3rd
1997 All-Japan GT champion & Japanese Touring Car Championship 3rd, one win
1998 Super Tourenwagen Cup & 5th at Le Mans (Nissan R390 GT1)
1999 All-Japan GT; Formula Nippon & No Finish at Le Mans (Nissan R391)
2000 All-Japan GT & Formula Nippon 2nd
2001 CART (Dale Coyne Racing, 2 races); Formula Nippon & All-Japan GT, 1 win
2002 All-Japan GT & 3rd at Le Mans, (Audi R8)
2003 All-Japan GT champion
2004 All-Japan GT, one win
2005 Super GT; Le Mans (Dallara SP1, did not finish)
2006 Super GT
2007 Super GT & Formula Nippon
2008 Super GT
2009 Le Mans Series (Kolles, 1 race) & FIA GT Championship (NISMO/Gigawave, 4 races)
2010 FIA GT1 World Championship (Nissan GT-R)
2011 FIA GT1 World Championship (Nissan GT-R) Drivers Champion
2012 Super GT
2013 Super GT
2014 Super GT
2015 Super GT

Complete Japanese Formula 3 results
(key) (Races in bold indicate pole position) (Races in italics indicate fastest lap)

Complete Japanese Formula 3000/Formula Nippon results
(key) (Races in bold indicate pole position) (Races in italics indicate fastest lap)

Complete JTCC results
(key) (Races in bold indicate pole position) (Races in italics indicate fastest lap)

Complete JGTC/Super GT results
(key) (Races in bold indicate pole position) (Races in italics indicate fastest lap)

Complete Super Tourenwagen Cup results
(key) (Races in bold indicate pole position) (Races in italics indicate fastest lap)

24 Hours of Le Mans results

American open-wheel racing results
(key)

CART

Complete GT1 World Championship results

References

External links

  (requires Macromedia Flash)

1970 births
Living people
Champ Car drivers
German expatriate sportspeople in Japan
Japanese Formula 3000 Championship drivers
Formula Nippon drivers
Super GT drivers
Japanese Touring Car Championship drivers
FIA GT Championship drivers
24 Hours of Le Mans drivers
German Formula Three Championship drivers
Japanese Formula 3 Championship drivers
German racing drivers
American Le Mans Series drivers
European Le Mans Series drivers
FIA GT1 World Championship drivers
EFDA Nations Cup drivers
People from Reutlingen
Sportspeople from Tübingen (region)
Racing drivers from Baden-Württemberg
FIA World Endurance Championship drivers
24 Hours of Spa drivers
G+M Escom Motorsport drivers
Dale Coyne Racing drivers
Nismo drivers
Team Joest drivers
Kondō Racing drivers
TOM'S drivers
Team LeMans drivers
Audi Sport drivers
Kolles Racing drivers
Team Aguri drivers
Josef Kaufmann Racing drivers
Highcroft Racing drivers
Greaves Motorsport drivers
Team Rosberg drivers
Nürburgring 24 Hours drivers